Heavyweight  is a weight class in combat sports and professional wrestling.

Boxing

Professional
In 2020, the World Boxing Council increased their heavyweight classification to 224 pounds (102 kg; 16 st)  to allow for their creation of the bridgerweight division.

Historical development
Because this division had no weight limit, it has been historically vaguely defined.

Any fighter weighing more than 175 pounds was a heavyweight. Later these organizations increased the cruiserweight limit to 200 pounds.

Since 1975, the Amateur Athletic Union of the United States and the Soviet Sports Committee established a new concept in international boxing, called "Heavy Duals," an all-heavyweight team contest between the United States and the Soviet Union.

As of 2021, Wladimir Klitschko holds the record of most boxers beaten for the world heavyweight title, with 23. Klitschko holds the record for the longest cumulative heavyweight title reign of all time, with 4,382 days as world heavyweight champion. Joe Louis has won the most world heavyweight title bouts, with 27. Louis holds the record for most consecutive title defenses at this division, with 26 defenses of the world title. This is also the record for most consecutive title defenses in boxing history.

Four boxers have regained the heavyweight title in an immediate rematch: Floyd Patterson in 1960, Muhammad Ali in 1978, Lennox Lewis in 2001, and Anthony Joshua in 2019. George Foreman holds the record for being the oldest heavyweight to ever achieve championship status, becoming champion at the age of 45, while Mike Tyson possesses the record for youngest heavyweight champion at 20. Tyson also became the first heavyweight to own all three major belts – WBA, WBC, and IBF as well as The Ring and lineal heavyweight titles at the same time.

Current world champions

Current world rankings

The Ring

As of December 10, 2022.

Keys:
 Current The Ring world champion

BoxRec

Longest-reigning world heavyweight champions 

Keys:
 Active title reign
 Reign has ended

Note 1: WBA (Regular) champions are not included
Note 2: WBO heavyweight title bouts before August 1997 are not included
Note 3: The names in italics are champions that did not win The Ring championship/lineal championship (August 29, 1885–July 2, 1921)/undisputed championship (July 2, 1921–present)

Combined reign 
The list does not include The Ring and lineal championship fights after 1921.

As of 22 February 2020.

Individual reign 
Below is a list of longest reigning heavyweight champions in boxing measured by the individual's longest reign. The list includes both The Ring and lineal championships. Career total time as champion (for multiple time champions) does not apply.

Note: The names in italics are champions that did not win The Ring championship/lineal championship (August 29, 1885–July 2, 1921)/undisputed championship (July 2, 1921–present) during the reign

Amateur

A weight class named "super heavyweight" was established in 1984, and with it a maximum  for the heavyweight division.

Kickboxing
 International Kickboxing Federation (IKF) Heavyweight (Pro & Amateur) .

Mixed martial arts

Heavyweight is also the title of a documentary film that documented the fight camp of Fabrício Werdum when he became the UFC Heavyweight Champion.

Wrestling

The term "world heavyweight" in modern wrestling generally refers to a champion wrestler who is seen as a prominent competitor, rather than an adherent to a particular weight class. The World Heavyweight Championship in wrestling is usually considered the main title in a given promotion. Prior to the wrestling industry publicly acknowledging the predetermined nature of the sport, a Heavyweight title was generally competed for by larger wrestlers while smaller wrestlers competed as (among other names and classifications) "Junior Heavyweights" and "Light-Heavyweights".

Analogous uses
The word "heavyweight" is sometimes used in other fields (e.g. politics) to denote a person who is especially powerful or influential. Other boxing analogies include "punching above his [their] weight" to denote a person or entity (e.g. a country) whose influence is arguably greater than his/its basic attributes would suggest.

References

External links
 Barry Hugman's Boxing

Boxing weight classes
Kickboxing weight classes
Professional wrestling weight classes
Taekwondo weight classes
Wrestling weight classes